La Colorada may refer to:
La Colorada, Mexico
La Colorada, Los Santos, Panama
La Colorada, Veraguas, Panama
Carolina Duer, nickname of Argentine world champion boxer